Walter Edward Boyes (5 January 1913 – 16 September 1960) was an English footballer who earned three caps for the national team between 1935 and 1938. He played club football for West Bromwich Albion, Everton, Notts County and Scunthorpe United.

Biography
Boyes was born in Upperthorpe, Sheffield. After playing for Sheffield Boys and Woodhouse Mills United, he turned professional with West Bromwich Albion in February 1931. He scored in the 4–2 1935 FA Cup Final defeat to Sheffield Wednesday, the club he supported as a boy. In February 1938 Boyes joined Everton for a £6000 fee  and instantly formed a great left wing partnership with Alex Stevenson, which helped the side clinch the 1938/39 league title.

During the Second World War, he appeared as a guest player for Aldershot, Brentford, Clapton Orient, Leeds United, Manchester United, Middlesbrough, Millwall, Newcastle United, Preston North End and Sunderland.

In June 1949, Boyes took up the role of player-coach at Notts County. He was Scunthorpe United's player-trainer between 1950 and 1953. He later became player-manager at Retford Town (1954) and Hyde United (1958). Boyes joined Swansea Town as trainer in 1959, but retired due to illness in May of the following year.

References

External links
Everton career summary
Player profile at EnglandStats.com
Player profile at Spartacus Educational

1913 births
1960 deaths
English footballers
England international footballers
West Bromwich Albion F.C. players
Everton F.C. players
Notts County F.C. players
Scunthorpe United F.C. players
Retford Town F.C. players
Hyde United F.C. players
English Football League players
English Football League representative players
Association football wingers
Brentford F.C. wartime guest players
Footballers from Sheffield
FA Cup Final players